The S14 district lies within in the City of Sheffield, South Yorkshire, England.  The district contains 2 listed buildings that are recorded in the National Heritage List for England.  Both the listed buildings are designated at Grade II, the lowest of the three grades, which is applied to "buildings of national importance and special interest".  The district is in the south east of the city of Sheffield, and covers the Gleadless Valley area.  The listed buildings consist of a pub and a community centre.

For neighbouring areas, see listed buildings in S2, listed buildings in S8 and listed buildings in S12.


Buildings

References

Citations

Sources

 

 S14
Sheffield S14